There are over two hundred scheduled monuments in Cheshire, a county in North West England, which date from the Neolithic period to the middle of the 20th century.  This list includes the scheduled monuments in Cheshire from 1540 to the present, the periods accepted by Revealing Cheshire's Past as post-medieval and modern.

A scheduled monument is a nationally important archaeological site or monument which is given legal protection by being placed on a list (or "schedule") by the Secretary of State for Culture, Media and Sport; English Heritage takes the leading role in identifying such sites.  The current legislation supporting this is the Ancient Monuments and Archaeological Areas Act 1979.  The term "monument" can apply to the whole range of archaeological sites, and they are not always visible above ground. Such sites have to have been deliberately constructed by human activity.  They range from prehistoric standing stones and burial sites, through Roman remains and medieval structures such as castles and monasteries, to later structures such as industrial sites and buildings constructed for the World Wars or the Cold War.

This list includes structures dating from the early post-medieval period, through the period of the Industrial Revolution, to sites prepared for warfare in the 20th century.  The monuments from the earlier part of the period tend to be similar in type to those in the medieval period, namely moats or moated sites, and churchyard crosses and also include a dovecote and a duck decoy.  Structures dating from the Industrial Revolution include the remains of a mine, canal locks and a bridge, a salt works, a boat lift, and a transporter bridge within a factory.  The structures dating from the 20th century consist of a former Royal Air Force airfield and the remains of three sites for anti-aircraft guns.

See also

List of scheduled monuments in Cheshire dated to before 1066
List of scheduled monuments in Cheshire (1066–1539)

References

 
 
Scheduled
Cheshire